William "Woody" Kincaid (born September 21, 1992) is an American long-distance runner. He won the gold medal for the 5000 meters at the 2022 NACAC Championships. Kincaid is the North American indoor record holder in that event.

High school
Woody Kincaid attended Columbine High School in Littleton, Colorado, where he emerged as one of the top high school distance runners in Colorado until he graduated in 2011. While competing in high school cross country and track he became a multiple-time state finalist highlighted by 2010 5A Cross Country State championship individual title.

Collegiate
Kincaid attended University of Portland, where representing Portland Pilots and coached by Rob Conner also competed in track and cross country. He accumulated two All-American honors. At the 2016 NCAA DI Outdoor T&F Championships, he placed ninth in the men's 5000 meter final. Kincaid earned an MBA from Portland in 2016. One of his best performances at the University of Portland came when he was the fifth and final scorer on the 2014 third place men's cross country team. He finished in 70th place, passing an astounding 50 people in the last 2 kilometers of the race.

Professional
In 2016, Kincaid finished eighth in the 5000 meters at the US Olympic Trials.

In 2017, he started a podcast in digital media Citius Magazine that can be found through channels like SoundCloud and ITunes. That same year, he earned a silver medal in second place in two miles at USA Indoor Track and Field Championships.

On September 10, 2019, Kincaid became the eighth man in American history to break 13 minutes in the 5000 m, when he ran a time of 12:58.1. It was the fifth-fastest time in US history at the time.

In 2021, he placed seventh in the Prickly Pear Invitational over 3000 m with a personal best of 7:46.07. The meet was held in Phoenix, Arizona on February 6. On February 20, he competed in the 10,000 m at the TEN, a meet held by Sound Running in Southern California. There Kincaid placed third to his Bowerman teammates Marc Scott and Grant Fisher, running a personal best of 27:12.78. His time moved him to sixth on the all-time U.S. list for the distance. At the delayed 2020 US Olympic Trials, he won the 10,000 m event and earned a spot on the US Olympic team along with Fisher and Joe Klecker; he also placed third in the 5000 m. At the Tokyo Games, Kincaid finished 14th and 15th in the 5000 m and 10,000 m respectively.

He was coached by Jerry Schumacher in the Bowerman Track Club from 2016-2022.

In 2023, he moved to Flagstaff, Arizona to be coached by Mike Smith at Northern Arizona University. On January 27 at the Boston University John Thomas Terrier Classic in Boston, the 30-year-old broke the North American indoor record in the 5000 m with a time of 12:51.61, slicing more than two seconds off Grant Fisher’s mark set on the same track in February 2022. His closing splits included a 56.39 s for the final 400 m, and 26.27 s for the final lap. His performance put him fourth on the world indoor all-time list.

References

External links

William Kincaid University of Portland track Results

Living people
1992 births
Sportspeople from Littleton, Colorado
American male long-distance runners
American male middle-distance runners
University of Portland alumni
Portland Pilots athletes
Columbine High School alumni
USA Outdoor Track and Field Championships winners
Athletes (track and field) at the 2020 Summer Olympics
Olympic track and field athletes of the United States
20th-century American people
21st-century American people